Camicinal is a motilin agonist for the treatment of gastroparesis.

References 

Drugs acting on the gastrointestinal system and metabolism
Motilin receptor agonists
Motility stimulants